The Razer Edge is a hybrid gaming tablet developed by Razer Inc. and was released worldwide in most regions on January, 2023. Razer Edge 5G model supports 5G.

References 

Handheld personal computers